Obaltan (also known as Aimless Bullet and Stray Bullet) is a 1960 South Korean tragedy film directed by Yu Hyun-mok. The plot is based on the novella of the same name by Yi Beomseon. It has often been called the best Korean movie ever made.

Plot
The film depicts Cheolho, an accountant who lives a hard life in post-war South Korea. He supports his pregnant wife, his younger sister Myeongsuk who is now a prostitute for American soldiers, his war veteran younger brother Yeongho, and his mother suffering from post-traumatic stress disorder constantly screaming "Let's get out of here!". Cheolho suffers from a toothache but refuses to go to the dentist, despite his brother urging that keeping the toothache is a much worse problem than paying the dentist.

Myeongsuk’s former fiancé is also a war veteran, but he was crippled and now needs crutches to walk. He breaks off the engagement, believing he will only be a burden.

Yeongho befriends an actress, Miri. Miri aims to help Yeongho get a job by making him an actor in a film project. While reading his lines for the film's script, Yeongho realizes that his character is being judged for his wounded appearance and he was chosen for the scars he received from the Korean War. Choosing dignity over a rare chance to earn money, Yeongho quits the film, though he later reconsiders and wonders if he was too rash to leave such a promising job.

He later meets Seol-hui, a former nurse during the Korean War who had tend to him in the hospital. They confess their love for each other, however, Seol-hui is later killed in a murder-suicide by her neighbor, who had been obsessed over Seol-hui. Seeing her with Yeongho drove him mad with jealousy, leading him to push her off the top of the apartment building they lived in before joining her himself.

The last, climactic part of the film portrays the brother, Yeongho, robbing a bank using a gun he secretly stole from Seol-hui. After being caught by the police, Yeongho gives up the money, then shortly his gun and himself, breaking down into tears as he is arrested by the police. Yeongho, now in jail, tells Cheolho to take his niece Hae Ok on a trip and be a good father to his wife's child.

After hearing that his wife has died from childbirth and failing to even see her body at the hospital or the baby who came out alive, Cheolho finally decides to visit the dentist. While Cheolho has two teeth that must be removed, the dentist refuses to remove more than one tooth for the same day. Cheolho tells the taxi driver to take him to the police station to see his brother, but once they arrive, he orders the driver to keep going anyway constantly repeating his mother's plea "Let's get out of here!". With his family gone and his toothache remaining, the taxi continues to drive aimlessly, leaving Cheolho's fate unknown.

Cast
Kim Jin-kyu as Cheolho
Choi Moo-ryong as Yeongho
Seo Ae-ja as Myeongsuk
Kim Hye-jeong
Noh Jae-sin
Moon Jung-suk
Yoon Il-bong
Yu Gye-seon
Nam Chun-yeok
Park Gyeong-hui

Reception
The government banned Obaltan because of its unremittingly downbeat depiction of life in post-armistice South Korea. An American consultant to the Korean National Film Production Center saw the film and persuaded the government to release it in Seoul so that it might qualify for entry in the San Francisco International Film Festival. Director Yu Hyun-mok attended the film's premier in San Francisco in November 1963. Variety called Obaltan a "remarkable film", and noted that its "brilliantly detailed camera work is matched by probing sympathy and rich characterizations."

Legacy
The most-cited quote from the film, mentioned in the contemporary Variety review and in later texts on South Korean cinema, is "Let's get outta here! Let's get outta here!"

Availability
In December 2002 Obaltan was released on Region 0 DVD in South Korea with English subtitles, but as of November 2007 is currently out of print. Gregory Hatanaka's Cinema Epoch released the film on Region 1 DVD on March 13, 2008.

See also
Cinema of South Korea

References

Sources

Further reading
The Journal of Korean Studies Vol 11, Number 1 (Fall 2006), Volume 11

External links

1960 films
1960 crime drama films
Films directed by Yu Hyun-mok
1960s Korean-language films
South Korean crime drama films